The 2017–18 season was Club Brugge's 126th season in existence and the club's 58th consecutive season in the top flight of Belgian football. Club Brugge participated in the Belgian First Division A, Belgian Cup and on the European stage in the UEFA Champions League and UEFA Europa League.

The club would win their 15th league this season, edging out closest competitors Standard Liège by 3 points following the championship round. The result was clinched in the penultimate match of the season, after a 1–1 draw away to Standard.

The season covered the period from 1 July 2017 to 30 June 2018.

First-team squad

Club friendlies

Competitions

Belgian First Division A

Regular season

Results summary

Results by matchday

Play-offs

Results summary

Results by matchday

Matches

Belgian Cup

UEFA Champions League

UEFA Europa League

Statistics

Squad appearances and goals
Last updated on 20 May 2018.

|-
! colspan=14 style=background:#dcdcdc; text-align:center|Goalkeepers

|-
! colspan=14 style=background:#dcdcdc; text-align:center|Defenders

|-
! colspan=14 style=background:#dcdcdc; text-align:center|Midfielders

|-
! colspan=14 style=background:#dcdcdc; text-align:center|Forwards

|-
! colspan=14 style=background:#dcdcdc; text-align:center|Players who have made an appearance this season but have left the club

|}

References

External links
  
 Official Facebook Fanpage
 Official Twitter account
 Official Fan Federation 
 Blue Army – Fan Association & Fan-zine 
 Club Brügge KV XtraTime Fanpage 
 Club Brügge at UEFA.COM 
 Club Brügge at EUFO.DE
 Club Brügge at Weltfussball.de
 Club Brügge at Football Squads.co.uk
 Club Brügge at National Football Teams.com
 Club Brügge at Football Lineups.com

Belgian football clubs 2017–18 season
Club Brugge KV seasons
Belgian football championship-winning seasons